The Ultimate Incantation is the debut album by Polish death metal band Vader. It was released in 1992 by Earache Records. A music video was shot for the song "Dark Age", which was directed by Kimmo Kuusniemi and Tanja Katinka. The cover art was drawn by Dan Seagrave. The album was originally recorded at Sunlight Studio with Thomas Skogsberg, but neither the record label or Vader was pleased with the outcome and decided to use another studio because of technical issues. The new studio that they recorded at was Rhythm Studios in England with producer Paul Johnson. Piotr "Peter" Wiwczarek commented on Decibel magazine about recording album at Sunlight Studios, saying:

Track listing

Personnel
Production and performance credits are adapted from the album liner notes.

 Vader
 Piotr "Peter" Wiwczarek − rhythm guitar, lead guitar, bass guitar, lead vocals, lyrics
 Krysztof "Doc" Raczkowski − drums
 Jacek "Jackie" Kalisz − bass guitar (credited, did not perform)
 Jaroslaw "China" Labieniec − rhythm guitar, lead guitar (credited, did not perform) 

 Production
 Paweł Wasilewski − lyrics
 Paul Johnson − sound engineering, producer
 Dan Seagrave − cover artwork
 Francesca Hollings − photography  
 Tomek Malinowski − photography

 Note
 Recorded & mixed at Rhythm Studios, England, UK, 1992

Release history

References

1992 debut albums
Albums with cover art by Dan Seagrave
Vader (band) albums
Earache Records albums